Xinlong County is a county in the west of Sichuan Province, China. It is under the administration of the Garzê Tibetan Autonomous Prefecture.

Xinlong County is part of historical region of Nyarong. 

Jazi (Nyarong Jazi Gon; Jazi Gon Sangngak Dechen Choling; gya bzi dgon, gya dgon, ja bzi dgon gsang sngags bde chen chos gling) is a Nyingma monastery in Xilong County that was founded in 1866. Jazi Amnye Drodul Pema Garwang Lingpa (1901–1975) studied here as a young boy, before going to Tromge Monastery.

Towns and townships
 Rulong Town (茹龙镇)
 Dagai Town (大盖镇)
 Larima Town (拉日马镇)
 Shadui Township (沙堆乡)
 Le'an Township (乐安乡)
 Ronglu Township (绕鲁乡)
 Sewei Township (色威乡)
 Jialaxi Township (甲拉西乡)
 Bomei Township (博美乡)
 Youlaxi Township (尤拉西乡)
 Zituoxi Township (子拖西乡)
 Heping Township (和平乡)
 Luogu Township (洛古乡)
 Xionglongxi Township (雄龙西乡)
 Mari Township (麻日乡)
 Tongxiao Township (通霄乡)
 Youyi Township (友谊乡)
 Pica Township (皮擦乡)
 Yanduo Township (银多乡)

Climate

References 

Populated places in the Garzê Tibetan Autonomous Prefecture
County-level divisions of Sichuan